Thomas Wheate may refer to:
 Sir Thomas Wheate, 1st Baronet, English landowner and politician
 Sir Thomas Wheate, 2nd Baronet, English politician